Coaker is a surname of English origin. The name may refer to:

Coaker Triplett (Herman Coaker Triplett) (1911–1992), American professional baseball player
Graham Coaker (1932–1971), British engineer and businessman
Vernon Coaker (born 1953), British politician and government minister
William Coaker (1871–1938), Canadian labor union leader and politician

See also
Cocker (disambiguation)
Coker (surname)

Surnames of English origin